Pūkorokoro / Miranda (until 2015 known as Miranda) is a historical fort and small village in the Firth of Thames, New Zealand. The locality is mostly known for the Pūkorokoro Miranda Naturalists' Trust, a charitable trust to encourage people to visit the coastline and appreciate its wide range of flora and fauna.

Attractions
It is best known as the location of the Miranda Shorebird Centre, owned and operated by the Pūkorokoro Miranda Naturalists' Trust. The Miranda Hot Springs are another attraction for visitors.

The local Makomako Marae is a traditional meeting ground for Ngāti Pāoa, and features the Rangimarie meeting house.

History
The Ngāti Paoa village of Pūkorokoro was renamed after the warship HMS Miranda, which brought 300 soldiers of the 70th Surrey Regiment to the area in 1863, together with 600 more men on other ships. Although the local iwi, Ngāti Pāoa, was loyal to the Crown, their settlement Pūkorokoro was shelled by the Miranda, killing many of the villagers. The soldiers were to build a fort supporting the British troops fighting in the Waikato region during the New Zealand Wars. Several redoubts were eventually built, one of them named after the ship leading the small troop flotilla. A local headland also carries the name, together ensuring that the name became fixed.

Name
In 2012, the local iwi, Ngāti Pāoa, made the Miranda Naturalists' Trust aware of their longstanding grievance that the historic name of the area—Pūkorokoro—was lost during the Invasion of the Waikato. The Trust responded favourably to a dual-name proposal but said that due to their international profile being tied to the name Miranda, they could not drop "Miranda" from their name yet. The Miranda Naturalists' Trust consulted its membership about their proposed name change in August 2013 and at the subsequent annual general meeting in May 2014, a unanimous decision was passed by the 50 members present in support of the name change to Pūkorokoro Miranda Naturalists' Trust.

Ngāti Pāoa then proposed, through the Office of Treaty Settlements, that a dual name of Pūkorokoro / Miranda be assigned to the area. Also proposed were to rename the nearby Miranda Hot Springs, and the locality adjacent to the hot springs of the same name. The New Zealand Geographic Board added to the proposal that the local hill Pukorokoro be renamed to receive a macron and that the same would happen to Pukorokoro Stream.

The hill and stream's altered names (a macron was added as proposed) were gazetted on 26 February 2015 and the other name changes were gazetted on 13 August 2015 as follows:
the hot spring was assigned the dual name Pūkorokoro / Miranda Hot Springs
the locality adjacent to the hot spring was assigned the dual name Pūkorokoro / Miranda Hot Springs
the populated place "Miranda" was changed to Pūkorokoro / Miranda

Demographics
The SA1 area is part of the larger Miranda-Pūkorokoro statistical area.

The SA1 area had a population of 120 at the 2018 New Zealand census, unchanged since the 2013 census, and an increase of 12 people (11.1%) since the 2006 census. There were 45 households, comprising 63 males and 57 females, giving a sex ratio of 1.11 males per female. The median age was 47.4 years (compared with 37.4 years nationally), with 15 people (12.5%) aged under 15 years, 24 (20.0%) aged 15 to 29, 54 (45.0%) aged 30 to 64, and 24 (20.0%) aged 65 or older.

Ethnicities were 90.0% European/Pākehā, 20.0% Māori, 2.5% Pacific peoples, and 5.0% Asian. People may identify with more than one ethnicity.

Although some people chose not to answer the census's question about religious affiliation, 57.5% had no religion, and 32.5% were Christian.

Of those at least 15 years old, 18 (17.1%) people had a bachelor's or higher degree, and 18 (17.1%) people had no formal qualifications. The median income was $32,800, compared with $31,800 nationally. 18 people (17.1%) earned over $70,000 compared to 17.2% nationally. The employment status of those at least 15 was that 60 (57.1%) people were employed full-time, 21 (20.0%) were part-time, and 3 (2.9%) were unemployed.

Miranda-Pūkorokoro statistical area

Miranda-Pūkorokoro had a population of 849 at the 2018 New Zealand census, an increase of 63 people (8.0%) since the 2013 census, and an increase of 186 people (28.1%) since the 2006 census. There were 360 households, comprising 444 males and 405 females, giving a sex ratio of 1.1 males per female. The median age was 54.0 years (compared with 37.4 years nationally), with 114 people (13.4%) aged under 15 years, 90 (10.6%) aged 15 to 29, 399 (47.0%) aged 30 to 64, and 243 (28.6%) aged 65 or older.

Ethnicities were 86.6% European/Pākehā, 28.3% Māori, 1.8% Pacific peoples, 2.1% Asian, and 0.0% other ethnicities. People may identify with more than one ethnicity.

The percentage of people born overseas was 10.2, compared with 27.1% nationally.

Although some people chose not to answer the census's question about religious affiliation, 57.6% had no religion, 31.8% were Christian, 1.4% had Māori religious beliefs, 0.4% were Buddhist and 0.4% had other religions.

Of those at least 15 years old, 81 (11.0%) people had a bachelor's or higher degree, and 198 (26.9%) people had no formal qualifications. The median income was $28,200, compared with $31,800 nationally. 99 people (13.5%) earned over $70,000 compared to 17.2% nationally. The employment status of those at least 15 was that 327 (44.5%) people were employed full-time, 120 (16.3%) were part-time, and 18 (2.4%) were unemployed.

References

External links
Pūkorokoro Miranda Shorebird Centre
Miranda Hot Springs

Populated places in Waikato
Hauraki District
Geography of Waikato
Populated places around the Firth of Thames